Buali Sina University, also written Bu-Ali Sina University (Danushgah-e Bu'li Sina), or simply BASU, is a public university in the city of Hamedan in the Hamedan province of Iran. The university was established with the assistance of France in February 1973. Bu-Ali Sina University ranked in the fifth place of Iranian national universities (QS 2023)

The university's programs include Chemistry, Electrical Engineering, Civil Engineering, Mechanical Engineering, Industrial Engineering, and Agricultural Engineering.

History 
The first steps for founding Bu-Ali Sina University were taken after a treaty between the governments of Iran and France in Esfand 1351 (February 1973). The University was established in 1353 (1975). It was named for the Persian polymath Buali Sina (Avicenna).

Academics
Bu-Ali Sina University has five faculties, one higher education complex, and two junior schools. Faculties include Agriculture, Art and Architecture, Engineering, Literature and Humanities, Science, Malayer Junior Faculty of Education, and Junior School of Veterinary Medicine.

It has 439 full-time faculty members who have graduated from universities around the world. It has more than 10,000 students who are studying in 319 education programs at B.Sc., M.Sc. and Ph.D. levels. More than 45 thousand students have been graduated up to 2021.

Bu-Ali Sina University has 32 departments, most of which admit students at B.Sc. and M.Sc. and Ph.D. levels.

Faculties and schools 

 Faculty of Agriculture
 Faculty of Art and Architecture
 Faculty of Engineering
 Faculty of Engineering of Toyserkan
 Faculty of Literature and Humanities
 Faculty of Science
 Faculty of Chemistry
 Faculty of Economics and Social Science
 Junior School of Veterinary Medicine
 Nahavand Junior School of Physical Education

See also
Higher Education in Iran

References

External links

 Official website
 Axaya Research Group

 
Educational institutions established in 1973
Education in Hamadan Province
1973 establishments in Iran
Buildings and structures in Hamadan Province